Mile Škorić (born 19 June 1991) is a Croatian football defender, currently playing for Osijek in the Prva HNL, and for the Croatia national football team.

Club career
Škorić started his career playing at youth level for the local club in his village Novi Mikanovci before joining the HNK Cibalia Vinkovci academy. At the age of 15 he moved on to Osijek with whom he had signed a scholarship contract in February 2010. He made his debut for the first team as a late substitute in a 1–1 draw against Zadar on 22 March 2008 in the 25th round of 2007–08 season. He scored his first goal in Prva HNL in a 5–1 away win against Rijeka on 23 October 2010. In 2011, he left Osijek and spent half a season with Gorica in Druga HNL, before moving to HAŠK in the same division. Škorić moved back to Osijek prior to the commencement of the 2013–14 season. Škorić played an array of midfield, side-line and offensive positions in top-tier football before settling as a central defender in 2017. His appearance and then oft misunderstood positional and passing creativity earned him the nickname "Zidane iz Novih Mikanovaca" (Zidane from Novi Mikanovci).

Career statistics

International career
Škorić was first called up by Croatia on May 28, 2017 for a friendly match against Mexico.  His first competitive cap came on June 8, 2019 against Wales in a Euro 2020 qualifier.

He became a cult hero when he drove himself from Osijek to Split (6+ hr drive) to guard Cristiano Ronaldo in a UEFA Nations League match against  Portugal.  Days before the November 17, 2020 match Zlatko Dalic lost all of his central defenders to injuries and COVID.  He called up Škorić, who was on the preliminary squad, two days before the match.  He earned acclaim for his performance in the match and managed to keep Ronaldo scoreless (Portugal won the game 3-2 with a 90th minute goal).

He was a part of the Croatian Euro 2020 squad, but did not make a single appearance during the tournament.

References

External links
 
 

1991 births
Living people
Sportspeople from Vinkovci
Association football defenders
Croatian footballers
Croatia youth international footballers
Croatia international footballers
UEFA Euro 2020 players
NK Osijek players
HNK Gorica players
NK HAŠK players
Croatian Football League players
First Football League (Croatia) players